Bethnal Green North East was a parliamentary constituency in London, which returned one Member of Parliament (MP)  to the House of Commons of the Parliament of the United Kingdom.  It was created for the 1885 general election and abolished for the 1950 general election

Boundaries 

The constituency consisted of the north and east wards of the civil parish of Bethnal Green, Middlesex (later the Metropolitan Borough of Bethnal Green in the County of London).

1885-1918: The North and East wards of the parish of St. Matthew, Bethnal Green.

Members of Parliament

Notes:-
  a No election. Nathan resigned the Liberal whip.
  b No election. Nathan took the Labour whip.

Election results

Elections in the 1880s

Elections in the 1890s

Elections in the 1900s

Elections in the 1910s

 
General election 1914–15:

Another general election was required to take place before the end of 1915. The political parties had been making preparations for an election to take place and by the July 1914, the following candidates had been selected; 
Liberal: Edwin Cornwall
Unionist:

Elections in the 1920s
:

Elections in the 1930s

Elections in the 1940s
General election 1939–40

Another general election was required to take place before the end of 1940. The political parties had been making preparations for an election to take place and by the autumn of 1939, the following candidates had been selected; 
Labour: Dan Chater
Liberal: Ormond Lewis

References

Politics of the London Borough of Tower Hamlets
Parliamentary constituencies in London (historic)
Constituencies of the Parliament of the United Kingdom established in 1885
Constituencies of the Parliament of the United Kingdom disestablished in 1950
Bethnal Green